Malcolm Roberts may refer to:

Malcolm Roberts (cricketer) (born 1960), English cricketer
Malcolm Roberts (politician) (born 1955), Australian politician
Malcolm Roberts (singer) (1944–2003), English traditional pop singer